Giovanni Domenico Cignaroli (1722–1793) was an Italian painter of the Rococo and early Neoclassic period between 1744 up until his death in 1793. He was the brother of the prominent Veronese painter Gianbettino Cignaroli.

Biography
He was born and died in Verona, where he painted sacred works, including for the church of Sant'Eufemia.

References

1722 births
1793 deaths
Painters from Verona
18th-century Italian painters
Italian male painters
Rococo painters
18th-century Italian male artists